Adelard Alexander "Eddie" Ouellette (March 9, 1911 – August 22, 1975)  was a professional ice hockey left winger who played one year in the National Hockey League with the Chicago Black Hawks.

Playing career
Born in Ottawa, Ontario, Ouellette played juniors in Windsor and Walkerton before joining the Toronto Millionaires of the IHL. He remained in the IHL for six seasons, playing with the Pittsburgh Yellowjackets, Windsor Bulldogs, and London Tecumsehs before being signed by the Black Hawks for the 1935–36 NHL season. He played 43 games that year, serving mostly as a checker. Following his lone NHL season Ouellette joined the Portland Buckaroos of the Pacific Coast Hockey League. He remained there for five years, and retired in 1942 after playing a single season with the Lachine Flyers of the Quebec Provincial Hockey League.

References

External links
 

1911 births
1975 deaths
Canadian ice hockey left wingers
Chicago Blackhawks players
Ice hockey people from Ottawa
London Tecumsehs players
Pittsburgh Yellow Jackets (IHL) players
Portland Buckaroos players
Windsor Bulldogs (1929–1936) players